Polycrates (Polykratēs) may refer to:

Persons
 Polycrates, tyrant of Samos from c. 538 BC to 522 BC
 Polycrates (sophist) (c. 440-370 BC), author of paradoxical encomia and an Accusation of Socrates
 Polycrates of Ephesus (fl. c. AD 130-196), bishop
 Polycrates of Argos

Other
 Dalla polycrates, a butterfly in the family Hesperiidae
 Der Ring des Polykrates (poem), a lyrical ballad written in 1797